The Internet Bookshop was a British online bookseller based in Oxford, started in 1994 by Darryl Mattocks.

The company was incorporated as a private limited company in October 1992 with founding director Darryl Mattocks. It was originally called VisionAssist Limited and provided information technology consultancy services. In 1994, using personal funding and a loan from the Blackwell family (who own Blackwell UK) the company based in Oxford started to sell books online from the www.bookshop.co.uk website. In April 1996, the name of the company was changed to The Internet Bookshop (Oxford) Limited.

In February 1997, the company was transferred to a new holding company called bookshop.co.uk PLC which was floated on the OFEX market, raising £1 million. For the year 1997 turnover was £2.1M, up from £0.6M the year before, and a loss of £0.4M was recorded. The total number of books available was 1.4 million.

Owing to the timing of the launch as an online bookseller, comparisons were made at the time to Amazon.com and the difference in their trajectories.

In June 1998, the company was sold for £9.4M to WHSmith. The original website address is now redirected to the main WHSmith page.

The Internet Bookshop (Oxford) Limited was dissolved in February 2008.

References 

1994 establishments in England
2008 disestablishments in England
Defunct retail companies of the United Kingdom